Jack McClelland may refer to:

 Jack McClelland (basketball), American college basketball coach
 Jack McClelland (footballer, born 1930) (1930–2004), English footballer who played in the Football League for Rochdale, Swindon Town and Stoke City
 Jack McClelland (footballer, born 1940) (1940–1976), Northern Irish international footballer who played as a goalkeeper
 Jack McClelland (publisher) (1922–2004), Canadian publisher
 Jack McClelland (tournament director) (born 1951), poker tournament director and member of the Poker Hall of Fame

See also